Lock-Up is an American crime drama series that premiered in syndication in September 1959 and concluded in June 1961. The half-hour episodes had little time for character development or subplots. It instead presented a compact story without embellishment.

Series overview
The program stars Macdonald Carey as real-life Philadelphia corporate attorney Herbert L. Maris (1880–1960) and John Doucette as police detective Lieutenant Jim Weston.  Maris died during the program's initial run.

Each episode began with the following introduction: "These stories are based on the files and case histories of Herbert L. Maris, prominent attorney, who has devoted his life to saving the innocent."

The foundation of each episode is the cornerstone of English and American jurisprudence: a person charged with a crime is innocent until proven guilty in a court of law. The series featured stories of persons who were unjustly accused, usually due to circumstantial evidence. The program's primary theme is that when individuals are charged with a crime, not all is as it first appears and a thorough investigation is duly warranted in order to uncover vital facts pertinent to the case.

Herbert L. Maris had an uncanny sense about the honest, innocent persons who had been falsely accused. With his lucrative private practice of corporate law, he also had the time and resources to help these people.  He was an attorney who spent his spare time helping defendants unjustly charged by the State. The stories portrayed in this series do not involve federal crimes.

Episodes

Season 1 (1959–60)

Season 2 (1960–61)

Guest stars
Among the many guest stars on the show were:

Dyan Cannon
Paul Carr
John Carradine
Albert Carrier
Jean Carson
Jack Cassidy
Andy Clyde
Robert Conrad
John Considine
Ellen Corby
Walter Coy
Angie Dickinson
James Drury
Buddy Ebsen
Ross Elliott
Joe Flynn
James Griffith

Neil Hamilton
Wanda Hendrix
Clark Howat
Adam Kennedy
Douglas Kennedy
Brett King
Robert Knapp
Ted Knight
Dayton Lummis
Gavin MacLeod
Tyler McVey
Joyce Meadows
Mary Tyler Moore
Leonard Nimoy
Stefanie Powers
Sherwood Price
Richard Reeves
Johnny Seven
Harry Dean Stanton
Lyle Talbot
Carol Thurston
Brad Trumbull
John Vivyan
Helen Walker
Patrick Waltz

Production notes
Ziv Television Programs, Inc., of Cincinnati, Ohio, a producer and distributor of more than 40 television shows during the 1950s including Highway Patrol, Sea Hunt, Science Fiction Theatre, and subsequently, ZIV-United Artists produced the television series. Later, Showcase Media of Studio City, California distributed the series.

Home media
ClassicFlix announced that they would release Season 1 on DVD in region 1 in 2017. However, these plans were shelved indefinitely on April 17, 2018, when ClassicFlix announced that they wouldn't be moving on with the project after all, due to the film elements not being in good enough shape.

References

External links
 
 Lock-Up sample episode ("Compulsion Killer") on YouTube (original air date: December 24, 1960)

1959 American television series debuts
1961 American television series endings
1950s American legal television series
1960s American legal television series
1950s American crime drama television series
1960s American crime drama television series
Black-and-white American television shows
English-language television shows
First-run syndicated television programs in the United States
Television series by Ziv Television Programs
Television shows set in Philadelphia